Flers may refer to several communes in France:

 Flers, Orne
 Flers, Pas-de-Calais
 Flers, Somme
 Flers-en-Escrebieux, Nord
 Flers-lez-Lille, Nord; now part of Villeneuve d'Ascq
 Flers-sur-Noye, Somme